6th FFCC Awards 
January 2, 2002

Best Film: 
 Amélie 
The 6th Florida Film Critics Circle Awards, given 2 January 2002, were announced on 3 January 2002.

Winners
Best Actor:
Billy Bob Thornton - Bandits, The Man Who Wasn't There and Monster's Ball
Best Actress:
Sissy Spacek - In the Bedroom
Best Animated Film:
Shrek
Best Cast:
Gosford Park
Best Cinematography:
The Man Who Wasn't There - Roger Deakins
Best Director:
Peter Jackson - The Lord of the Rings: The Fellowship of the Ring
Best Documentary Film:
startup.com
Best Film:
Amélie (Le fabuleux destin d'Amélie Poulain)
Best Foreign Language Film:
Amélie (Le fabuleux destin d'Amélie Poulain) • France/Germany
Best Newcomer:
John Cameron Mitchell - Hedwig and the Angry Inch
Best Screenplay:
Memento - Christopher Nolan
Best Song:
Stephen Trask - Hedwig and the Angry Inch
Best Supporting Actor:
Ben Kingsley - Sexy Beast
Best Supporting Actress:
Cate Blanchett - Bandits, The Lord of the Rings: The Fellowship of the Ring, The Man Who Cried and The Shipping News

2
F